The 2016–17 Buffalo Bulls men's basketball team represented the State University of New York at Buffalo during the 2016–17 NCAA Division I men's basketball season. The Bulls, led by second-year head coach Nate Oats, played their home games at Alumni Arena as members of the East Division of the Mid-American Conference. They finished the season 17–14, 11–7 in MAC play to finish in a tie for second place. As the No. 3 seed in the MAC tournament, they lost in the quarterfinals to Kent State.

Previous season
The Bulls finished the 2015–16 season 20–15, 10–8 in MAC play to finish in a tie for third place in the East Division and third place overall. They defeated Miami (OH), Ohio, and Akron to be champions of the MAC tournament and earn the conference's automatic bid to the NCAA tournament. In their second consecutive trip to the NCAA Tournament, they lost to Miami (FL) in the first round.

Departures

Recruiting class of 2016

Recruiting class of 2017

Roster

Schedule and results

|-
!colspan=9 style=| Exhibition

|-
!colspan=9 style=| Non-conference regular season

|-
!colspan=9 style=| MAC regular season

|-
!colspan=9 style=| MAC Tournament

See also
 2016–17 Buffalo Bulls women's basketball team

References

Buffalo
Buffalo Bulls men's basketball seasons
Buffalo Bulls
Buffalo Bulls